Lantian Road is a station on Line 9 and Line 14 of the Shanghai Metro. It is named after Lantian Road, which intersects with Yunshan Road one block south of the station. It began passenger trial operation with the rest of phase 3 of Line 9, an easterly extension with 9 new stations, on 30 December 2017. It became an interchange station as it also serves Line 14, which opened on 30 December 2021.

Station Layout

Gallery

References 

Railway stations in Shanghai
Shanghai Metro stations in Pudong
Railway stations in China opened in 2017
Line 9, Shanghai Metro
Line 14, Shanghai Metro